XTV is the NaSTA award-winning student television station at the University of Exeter. It is part of the Xmedia group of societies at the university and affiliated with the Students' Guild. Most of the station's content can be found on the YouTube channel.

History
There were plans for a student TV stations in 1990, involving, Guy Gadney and Thom Yorke. They proposed to set up "The Banana Network", but the idea got turned down by the Guild for unknown reasons, but funding played a part. When Guy Gudney returned from his year abroad, he did convince the Guild to set up a student TV station, and XTV was founded in 1992.

Originally situated in Cornwall House on Streatham Campus, it moved back and forth to Devonshire House several times over its history and now shares the Media Suite with the university's student newspaper Exeposé.
At the NaSTA conference in 2012, XTV was chosen as the next year's host. "NaSTA40", the ruby anniversary of the conference, was held in Exeter during 5–7 April 2013.

Awards and nominations

NaSTA Awards 
 2019 - Best Freshers’ Content
 2019 - Best Post-Production
 2019 - Highly Commended On-screen Female
 2018 - Best Technical Achievement
 2018 - Best Title Sequence
 2018 - Highly Commended News
 2018 - Highly Commended Live
 2017 - Best Freshers Coverage
 2017 - Best Writing
 2017 - Highly Commended Documentary
 2017 - Highly Commended On-Screen Female
 2017 - Highly Commended Post Production
 2016 - Best Light Entertainment
 2016 - Best News & Current Affairs
 2016 - Highly Commended Best Broadcaster
 2016 - Highly Commended Cinematography
 2016 - Highly Commended Music
 2016 - Highly Commended On-Screen Female
 2016 - Highly Commended Station Marketing
 2016 - Highly Commended Title Sequence
 2015 - Best Video to Music
 2015 - Best Writing
 2015 - Best Marketing
 2015 - Best Open
 2015 - Tim Marshall Award for Special Recognition 
 2015 - Highly Commended Title Sequence
 2015 - Highly Commended News and Current Affairs
 2015 - Highly Commended Comedy
 2014 - Best Cinematography
 2014 - Highly Commended Light Entertainment
 2013 - Best Title Sequence
 2013 - Highly Commended Tim Marshall Award for Special Recognition
 2013 - Highly Commended On-Screen Female (Fotini Papatheodorou)
 2013 - Highly Commended Ident
 2013 - Highly Commended Animation
 2013 - Runner Up People’s Choice Award for People’s Station
 2013 - Runner Up People’s Choice Award for Content Innovation
 2012 - Best Factual
 2012 - Highly Commended Documentary
 2012 - Highly Commended Video to Music
 2012 - Highly Commended On-Screen Female (Lindsey Harris)
 2011 - Best Video to Music
 2011 - Highly Commended Light Entertainment
 2010 - Best Title Sequence
 2010 - Best Light Entertainment
 2010 - Highly Commended Video to Music
 2010 - Highly Commended Factual
 2010 - Highly Commended Documentary
 2010 - Highly Commended Best Broadcaster
 2009 - Best Drama
 2009 - Highly Commended Best On-Screen Male (Richard Jones)
 2008 - Best Title Sequence
 2008 - Best Comedy Programme
 2008 - Best Factual
 2008 - Highly Commended Drama Programme
 2008 - Highly Commended Video to Music
 2007 - Best Music
 2007 - Best Title Sequence
 2007 - Highly Commended Factual
 2006 - Highly Commended Ident
 2006 - Highly Commended Title Sequence
 2006 - Highly Commended Comedy
 2003 - Best Drama
 2001 - Highly Commended Video to Music
 1999 - Best Video to Music
 1995 - Best Light Entertainment
 1995 - Runner Up News and Current Affairs
 1994 - Live Broadcast Award
 1994 - Light Entertainment Awards

Notable alumni
Past members and contributors of XTV have been
 Drew Pearce
 Emma B 
 Matthew Sydney, Producer at The Travelshow
 Tom Deacon
 Paul Jackson
 Adam Mason, producer of Ginx TV's flagship show The Blurp,

References

British student media groups
Student television stations in the United Kingdom
University of Exeter